is a Japanese voice actress. She stars in the anime shows including as Cecil in Wizard Barristers: Benmashi Cecil, Nanana in  Nanana's Buried Treasure, and Yu Shuu in Soul Buster. She also voices Rui Aoi in Ai Tenchi Muyo!, Ai Nishimura in One Week Friends and Kayoko in High School Fleet.

Filmography

Anime

Anime film
 High School Fleet: The Movie (2020), Kayoko Himeji

Video games

Drama CD

Dubbing
 Freaky, Ryler (Melissa Collazo)
 Mortal Engines, Clytie Potts (Sophie Cox)

References

External links
 Official blog 
 Official agency profile 
 

1997 births
Living people
Japanese video game actresses
Japanese voice actresses
Voice actresses from Tokyo
21st-century Japanese actresses